Myomatous erythrocytosis syndrome describes an excessive erythrocyte (red blood cells) production, occurring in about 0.5% of individuals affected by uterine leiomyomas (fibroids). This syndrome is believed to be caused by increased erythropoietin (EPO) production by the kidneys or by the leiomyomas themselves.

References

Red blood cell disorders
Syndromes